Alfredo de los Santos may refer to:
 Alfredo de los Santos (footballer)
 Alfredo de los Santos (cyclist)